Sovereign Hotel may refer to:

Sovereign Hotel (California), in Santa Monica, California, listed on the U.S. National Register of Historic Places (NRHP)
Sovereign Hotel (Oregon), in Portland, Oregon, also listed on the NRHP